The 2007 Major League Soccer season was the 12th season in the history of Major League Soccer. The season began on April 7 and concluded with MLS Cup 2007 on November 18, 2007 at Robert F. Kennedy Memorial Stadium in Washington, D.C.

For the first time in MLS history, the same two clubs consecutively won the MLS Cup title and the MLS Supporters' Shield honor. The 2007 MLS Cup champions were Houston Dynamo who defeated New England Revolution in the final. D.C. United won the MLS Supporters' Shield edging Chivas USA by two points for the regular season honor.

New England, Houston, and D.C. United earned berths into the inaugural CONCACAF Champions League for their performances in the regular season and playoffs.

Changes from the 2006 season

The 2007 season was often cited as the first season in the modern-era of Major League Soccer. Most notably, the regular season decreased from 32 matches to 30, emphasizing the importance of matches during this time window, as well as boosting the credibility for the MLS Supporters' Shield. This year marked the inaugural season for expansion franchise, Toronto FC who began play in the Eastern Conference.

For the 2007 MLS Cup Playoffs, the top two clubs in each conference automatically qualified for the playoffs, down from four. Additionally, the next four highest remaining point totals regardless of conference qualified via wild-card berth. The change allowed a single table to determine the entire playoff field.

Starting this season, MLS clubs were allowed to sell advertisements on the front of their jerseys. Six MLS clubs took advantage of the opportunity. Local corporations XanGo and Amigo Energy became the kit sponsors of Real Salt Lake and Houston Dynamo, respectively. More national brands such as BMO, Comex and Herbalife became the sponsors of Toronto FC, Chivas USA and Los Angeles Galaxy, respectively.  The international recognized brand, Red Bull became the shirt sponsor of New York Red Bulls, whom they owned.

 The Designated Player Rule was implemented, permitting one big-ticket foreign player to play for each team without going against the team's salary cap.Six players were signed under the rule for the 2007 season:
  David Beckham to the Los Angeles Galaxy
  Cuauhtémoc Blanco to the Chicago Fire
  Juan Pablo Ángel to New York Red Bulls
  Luciano Emilio to D.C. United
  Denílson to FC Dallas
  Guillermo Barros Schelotto to Columbus Crew

Two new soccer-specific stadiums opened this season. The Colorado Rapids moved into Dick's Sporting Goods Park in the Denver-suburb of Commerce City, Colorado. Before the season began, BMO Field opened for expansion side, Toronto FC.

Competition format

The format for the 2007 season was as follows:
The season ran from April 7 to November 18.
The 13 teams were split into two conferences. The Eastern Conference had seven teams with the addition of Toronto FC, while the Western Conference had six teams. Each team played 30 games that were evenly divided between home and away games. Each team played every other team twice, home and away, for a total of 24 games.  The remaining six games were played against six regional rivals, three at home and three away.
The two teams from each conference with the most points qualified for the playoffs. In addition, the next four highest point totals, regardless of conference, also qualified. In the first round aggregate goals over two matches determined the winners. The conference finals were played as a single match, and the winners advanced to MLS Cup 2007.  In all rounds, draws were followed by two 15-minute periods of extra time, followed by penalty kicks if necessary.  The away goals rule was not used in any round.
The team with the most points in the regular season won the MLS Supporters' Shield and qualified for the CONCACAF Champions League 2008–09. The MLS Cup winner also qualified for the Champions League 2008–09.  The MLS Cup runner-up qualified for the Champions League 2008–09. An additional berth in the Champions League was also awarded to the winner of the 2007 U.S. Open Cup. If a team qualified for multiple berths into the Champions League, then additional berths were awarded to the highest overall finishing MLS team(s) not already qualified. Also, Toronto FC, as a Canadian-based team, cannot qualify through MLS for the Champions League, and must instead qualify through the Canadian Championship.
The four teams with the most points in the regular season, regardless of conference, qualified for SuperLiga 2008.
The three teams from each conference with the most points also qualified for berths into the 2008 U.S. Open Cup.  The rest of the U.S.-based MLS teams had to qualify for the remaining two berths via a series of play-in games.

Tiebreakers

 Head-to-Head (Points only)
 Overall Goal Differential
 Overall Total Goals Scored
 Tiebreakers 1-3 applied only to matches on the road
 Tiebreakers 1-3 applied only to matches at home
 Fewest team disciplinary points in the League Fair Play table
 Coin toss

MLS Tiebreakers

Standings

Conference standings

Eastern Conference

Western Conference

Overall standings

 – Toronto FC cannot qualify for the CONCACAF Champions League through MLS.  Rather, they can qualify through the Canadian Championship.If they had qualified for the Champions League through MLS, then the highest placed team not already qualified would have qualified.
 – The winner of the 2007 MLS Supporters' Shield (D.C. United) and the winner of MLS Cup 2007 (Houston Dynamo) qualified for the 2008 CONCACAF Champions' Cup and the 2008–09 CONCACAF Champions League Group Stage. The runner-up of MLS Cup 2007 and the winner of the 2007 U.S. Open Cup (New England Revolution) qualified for the 2008–09 CONCACAF Champions League Preliminary Round. Because New England qualified twice, the additional berth in the preliminary round was awarded to the 2007 MLS Supporters' Shield runner-up (Chivas USA).

2007 MLS Cup Playoffs

1 The Kansas City Wizards earned the eighth and final playoff berth, despite finishing fifth in the Eastern Conference.They represent the fourth seed in the Western Conference playoff bracket, as only three teams in the Western Conference qualified for the playoffs.

Statistics

Golden Boot

Full article: MLS Golden Boot

Goalkeeping Leaders

Individual awards

Player of the Week

Player of the Month

Goal Of The Week

MLS Best XI

Team Attendance Totals

International competitions

CONCACAF Champions' Cup 2007

 D.C. UnitedDefeated  Club Deportivo Olimpia in the QuarterfinalsLost   Club Deportivo Guadalajara in the Semifinals.

 Houston DynamoDefeated  Puntarenas FC in the Quarterfinals.Lost  C.F. Pachuca in the Semifinals.

SuperLiga 2007

FC DallasFinished in fourth place and did not advance fromGroup A after going 0-1-2 in group play.

D.C. UnitedRunner-up of Group B after going 1-1-1 in group play.Lost to Los Angeles Galaxy in Semifinals.

Houston DynamoWinner of Group B after going 2-0-1 in group play.Lost to C.F. Pachuca on penalty kicks in the Semifinals.

Los Angeles GalaxyWinner of Group A after going 2-1-0 in group play.Defeated D.C. United in the SemifinalsLost to C.F. Pachuca on penalty kicks in the Final.

Copa Sudamericana 2007

D.C. UnitedLost to Club Deportivo Guadalajara on away goals in the Round of 16.

Other competitions

2007 Lamar Hunt U.S. Open Cup

Eight of the twelve U.S.-based MLS teams entered the tournament in the third round.

D.C. UnitedLost to Harrisburg City Islanders in the third round.

Los Angeles GalaxyLost to Richmond Kickers in the third round.

Chicago FireLost to Carolina RailHawks in the third round.

Houston DynamoLost to Charleston Battery in the third round.

Chivas USALost to Seattle Sounders (USL) in the third round

Colorado RapidsDefeated California Victory in the third round.Lost to Seattle Sounders (USL) in the Quarterfinals.

FC DallasDefeated Atlanta Silverbacks on penalty kicks in the third round,Defeated Charleston Battery after extra time in the Quarterfinals,Defeated Seattle Sounders (USL) after extra time in the Semifinals,Lost to New England Revolution in the Final.

New England RevolutionDefeated Rochester Raging Rhinos in the third round.Defeated Harrisburg City Islanders in the Quarterfinals.Defeated Carolina RailHawks after extra time in the Semifinals.Defeated FC Dallas in the Final.

All-Star game

The 2007 MLS All-Star Game was held at Dick's Sporting Goods Parkin Commerce City, Colorado, home of the Colorado Rapids on July 19.The opponent was Celtic F.C. of the Scottish Premier League.

Final Score:MLS All-Stars  2-0  Celtic F.C.

Coaches

Eastern Conference
Columbus Crew: Sigi Schmid
D.C. United: Tom Soehn
Kansas City Wizards: Curt Onalfo
Toronto FC: Mo Johnston

Western Conference
Chivas USA: Preki
Colorado Rapids: Fernando Clavijo
FC Dallas: Steve Morrow
Houston Dynamo: Dominic Kinnear
Los Angeles Galaxy: Frank Yallop
Real Salt Lake: John Ellinger and Jason Kreis

External links
MLS 2007 Season Stats

References

 
1

Major League Soccer seasons